Sandcoleidae is an extinct family of birds in the order Coliiformes (mousebirds). Fossils of this family have been found in Denmark and the United States. The group may be paraphylectic and is sometimes placed in the separate order Sandcoleiformes.

Taxonomy
Order COLIIFORMES
 Family †Sandcoleidae Houde & Olson 1992 sensu Mayr & Mourer-Chauviré 2004
 Genus †Sandcoleus Houde & Olson 1992 
†S. copiosus
 Genus †Anneavis Houde & Olson 1992 
†A. anneae
 Genus †Eoglaucidium Fischer 1987 
†E. pallas
 Genus †Tsidiiyazhi Ksepka et al., 2017
†T. abini

Some authorities also include Selmes absurdipes, Chascacocolius oscitans and Eobucco brodkorbi in this family.

References

Paleocene birds
Coliiformes
Eocene birds
Prehistoric bird families